65, 66 and I (Swedish: 65, 66 och jag) is a 1936 Swedish comedy film directed by Anders Henrikson and starring Thor Modéen, Carl Hagman and Katie Rolfsen. It was shot at the Råsunda Studios in Stockholm. The film's sets were designed by the art director Arne Åkermark.

Synopsis
A deserter from his military service steals the clothes of a wholesaler, unaware that he has just crashed into a lamppost in his car while drunk. In the confusion that follows the deserter gets sent to prison for thirty days while the wholesaler is taken away to complete his military duty.

Cast
 Thor Modéen as Karl-Alfred Pettersson
 Carl Hagman as 	65 Petrus Ramlösa
 Elof Ahrle as 	66 Pelle Frisk
 Katie Rolfsen as 	Amalia Jönsson
 Allan Bohlin as 	Lt. Nils Tjäder
 Elsa Carlsson as Lisa Pettersson
 Artur Cederborgh as 	Fritiof Blomberg
 Greta Wenneberg as 	Ellen Pettersson
 Nils Jacobsson as Hallén
 Sigge Fürst as 	Police constable
 Hugo Jacobsson as 	Sgt. Andersson
 Karl Kinch as 	Doctor
 Olav Riégo as 	Police inspector
 Rolf Botvid as 	Waiter at Grand 
 Birgit Chenon as 	Karl-Alfred's office clerk 
 Erland Colliander as 	Policeman 
 Hartwig Fock as 	Plainclothes policeman 
 Åke Grönberg as 	Castle guard 
 Wictor Hagman as 	Corporal 
 Keith Hårleman as 	Bathing beauty 
 Olle Jansson as 	Castle guard in tent 
 Helge Karlsson as 	Prison guard 
 Walter Lindström as 	Plainclothes policeman 
 Hugo Lundström as 	Waiter at the outdoor restaurant 
 Sven Magnusson as 	Castle guard 
 Siri Olson as 	Bathing beauty 
 Robert Ryberg as 	Maitre d' at Grand 
 Åke Uppström as Castle guard at the hospital 
 Eric von Gegerfelt as 	Guest at Grand 
 Elna-Britta Wallman as 	Bathing beauty

References

Bibliography 
 Larsson, Mariah & Marklund, Anders. Swedish Film: An Introduction and Reader. Nordic Academic Press, 2010.
 Qvist, Per Olov & von Bagh, Peter. Guide to the Cinema of Sweden and Finland. Greenwood Publishing Group, 2000.

External links 
 

1936 films
Swedish comedy films
1936 comedy films
1930s Swedish-language films
Films directed by Anders Henrikson
Swedish black-and-white films
1930s Swedish films